Prince Charming is a 2001 television film. It is a comical fairy tale, relating the story of a prince who is cursed and transported to present-day New York City. The film stars Martin Short as a wizard squire of modest talents trying to keep his prince (Sean Maguire) from harm, with Christina Applegate as a young woman skeptical of the prince's story, who nevertheless wins his love, and Bernadette Peters as an actress who inadvertently lifts a 500-year curse.

Plot
Prince John of the fictional province of Anwyn prides himself on having rescued countless maidens as a way of eventually bedding them. In order to end three centuries of war with the realm of Lothian, he is made to marry the princess, who is convinced that they will live happily ever after. However, on his wedding day, Prince John commits a romantic indiscretion and is discovered, breaking the heart of the princess. As punishment, he is cursed by being turned into a frog forever, until such time as a maiden kisses him and marries him by the next full moon. For good measure, his squire Rodney is similarly "frogged". The spell allows them to live for as long as it takes for John to be kissed human again.

Waiting 500 years, the Prince and Rodney, in the form of frogs, find themselves in New York's Central Park, where the Prince sees Kate driving her horse-drawn carriage and is almost kissed by her before she is interrupted and instead is released within Central Park. Later, an aging actress, Margo, impetuously picks up the frog prince and kisses him, breaking the curse until the next full moon, and turning the Prince and Rodney into their human selves (still dressed in medieval clothing, and with no knowledge of how the world has changed over the centuries).

Prince John and Rodney begin their search for the woman who kissed John, with the reluctant help of a skeptical Kate. After a series of comic encounters and setbacks, the Prince, in his human form, finally meets Margo, who is performing Shakespeare's "Romeo and Juliet". She decides to make her unfaithful lover, Hamish, jealous by initiating a romantic tryst. The Prince, realizing that he must marry Margo in order to permanently break the curse, proposes marriage, even as he is falling in love with Kate, who teaches him what true love is. Meanwhile, Rodney finds in Serena a fellow "wizard", and they try to find potions that will ensure that Prince John marries Margo.

In the end, the Prince decides to marry Kate, and almost gives up his humanity forever to do so. After Kate kisses him back into a human being, all three couples manage to find themselves with the right person, the curse is forever broken by true love (as was foretold when the spell was first enacted), and all marry to live happily ever after in modern New York City.

Cast listing
Source:

Production notes
The Delacorte Theatre in Central Park, New York, was used during filming of the Shakespeare productions. The television film was initially broadcast in the United States on the TNT station in July 2003.

Guru Studios, a Special Effects Company provided additional character animation.

Critical response
The New York Times reviewer wrote "She [Applegate] and Mr. Maguire make a suitably cute couple, and Mr. Short throws as much energy as he can muster (as usual, a lot) into the comic sidekick bit. Ms. Peters and Billy Connolly, as a full-of-himself director, do what they can. Only Andrea Martin, as Serena, Margo's put-upon gofer, manages to find (or invent) some real comedy."

See also
 "The Frog Prince", the fairy tale on which this film is loosely based

References

External links
 
 RHI Films listing for Prince Charming
Prince Charming at TNT

2001 television films
2001 films
2001 fantasy films
American fantasy films
American television films
Fantasy television films
Films about shapeshifting
Films based on Grimms' Fairy Tales
Films directed by Allan Arkush
Films set in New York City
Films based on fairy tales
2000s English-language films
The Frog Prince
2000s American films